Guri is a city in South Korea. It may also refer to:

People
 Guri or Gurri is an alternative spelling for Koori, a demonym for Aboriginal Australians in south-eastern Australia.
 Guri, a nickname for Tibetan activist Jigme Gyatso
 Guri, a character in Star Wars: Shadows of the Empire

Places
 Guri, a village in Walta (Dogu'a Tembien), Ethiopia
 Guri Dam, a dam in Venezuela
 Guri, Nigeria, a Local Government Area of Jigawa State
 Gowri, Fars, a village in Farashband County, Fars Province, Iran
 Guri, Hormozgan, a village in Qeshm County, Hormozgan Province, Iran
 Guri, Kermanshah, a village in Javanrud County, Kermanshah Province, Iran
 Guri, Khuzestan, a village in Masjed Soleyman County, Khuzestan Province, Iran
 Guri, Kohgiluyeh and Boyer-Ahmad, a village in Kohgiluyeh County, Kohgiluyeh and Boyer-Ahmad Province, Iran
 Guri, Chenaran, a village in Chenaran County, Razavi Khorasan Province, Iran
 Guri, Joghatai, a village in Joghatai County, Razavi Khorasan Province, Iran

Other uses
 BAaer Guri, an Argentine ultralight aircraft
 Guri (film), a Kannada Film released on 1986
 Guri (2004 film), a Telugu language film